The Tolowa people or Taa-laa-wa Dee-ni’ are a Native American people of the Athabaskan-speaking ethno-linguistic group. Two rancherias (Smith River and Elk Valley) still reside in their traditional territory in northwestern California. Those removed to the Siletz Reservation in Oregon are located there.

Related to current locations, Tolowa people are members of several federally recognized tribes: Tolowa Dee-ni' Nation (Tolowa, Chetco, Yurok), Elk Valley Rancheria (Tolowa and Yurok), Confederated Tribes of Siletz (more than 27 Native Tribes and Bands, speaking 10 distinct languages, including Athapascans speaking groups of SW Oregon, like Upper Umpqua, Coquille, Tututni, Chetco, Tolowa, Galice and Applegate River people), Trinidad Rancheria (Chetco, Hupa, Karuk, Tolowa, Wiyot, and Yurok), Big Lagoon Rancheria (Yurok and Tolowa), Blue Lake Rancheria (Wiyot, Yurok, and Tolowa) as well as the unrecognized Tolowa Nation.

History

Their homeland, Taa-laa-waa-dvn (“Tolowa ancestral-land”) lies along the Pacific Coast between the watersheds of Wilson Creek and Smith River (Tolowa-Chetco: Xaa-wun-taa-ghii~-li, Xaa-wvn’-taa-ghii~-li~, or Nii~-li~) basin and vicinity in northwestern California Del Norte. The area was bounded by the California/Oregon to the north and Wilson Creek, north of the Klamath River (Tolowa-Chetco: Tʽáˑtʃʽɪᵗˑʼdɜn) in California, to the south. They lived in approximately eight permanent villages including on Crescent Bay and Lake Earl (Tolowa-Chetco: Ee-chuu-le'  or Ch'uu-let - "large body of water"). The most important Tolowa village is Yontocket, California (Tolowa-Chetco: Yan’-daa-k’vt). Their tribal neighbors were the Chetco (Tolowa-Chetco: Chit Dee-ni’ or Chit-dv-ne' , also: Chit-dee-ni / Chit-dee-ne), Tututni (Tolowa-Chetco: T’uu-du’-dee-ni’ or Ta-́a te ́ne, also: Tu-́tutûn t̟ûn-nĕ) to the north; Shasta Costa (Tolowa-Chetco: Shis-taa-k'wvs-sta-dv-ne or See-staa-k’wvt-sta Dee-ni’), Takelma (Tolowa-Chetco: Ghan’-ts’ii-ne), Galice Creek / Taltushtuntede (Tolowa-Chetco: Talh-dash-dv-ne' ) to the NE, all of which were removed to the Siletz Reservation, and Karuk (Tolowa-Chetco: Ch'vm-ne Dee-ni' , also: Ch’vm-ne Xee-she’ ) to the east; and the Yurok (Tolowa-Chetco: Dvtlh-mvsh, also: Dvtlh-mvsh Xee-she’ ) to the south.

The name "Tolowa" is derived from Taa-laa-welh (Taa-laa-wa), an Algic name given to them by the Yurok (Klamath River People) (meaning "people of Lake Earl").

Their autonym is Hush, Xus or Xvsh, meaning "person" or "human being".

The neighboring Karuk called them Yuh'ára, or Yurúkvaarar ("Indian from downriver") and used this Karuk name also for the Yurok, and the Tolowa territory Yuh'aráriik / Yuh'ararih (″Place of the Downriver Indians″). Today the Karuk use also the term Imtípaheenshas (from Imtipahéeniik - ″Tolowa Indian place, i.e. Crescent City, California″).

They called themselves in a political sense also Dee-ni’ , Dee-ne, Dvn-’ee, Dee-te which means "(is a) citizen of a yvtlh-’i~ (polity)" or "a person belonging to a place or village".

The Tolowa or Dee-ni’ population exceeded 10,000. In the 19th century, epidemics of new infectious diseases, such as smallpox, broke out among the Tolowa, resulting in high mortality. These occurred before they had face-to-face encounters with non-natives because of contact through intermediaries. In 1828 the American Jedediah Smith and his exploration party were the first known non-natives to contact the Tolowa.

The Tolowa embraced the Ghost Dance religion from 1872 to 1882, in hopes of getting relief from European-American encroachment.

Genocide
In 1770 the Tolowa had a population of 1,000; their population soon dropped to 150 in 1910; this was almost entirely due to deliberate mass murder in what has been called genocide which has been recognized by the state of California. In a speech before representatives of Native American peoples in June 2019, California governor Gavin Newsom apologized for the genocide. Newsom said, "That’s what it was, a genocide. No other way to describe it. And that’s the way it needs to be described in the history books." Among these killings the Yontoket Massacre left 150 to 500 Tolowa people recorded dead. Because their homes had burned down, the place received the name "Burnt Ranch". The Yontoket massacre decimated the cultural center of the Tolowa peoples. The natives from the surrounding areas would gather there for their celebrations and discussions. The survivors of the massacre were forced to move to the village north of Smith's River called Howonquet. The slaughtering of the Tolowa people continued for some years. They were seemingly always caught at their Needash celebrations. These massacres caused some unrest which led in part to the Rogue River Indian war. Many Tolowa people were incarcerated at Battery Point in 1855 to withhold them from joining an uprising led by their chief. In 1860, after the Chetco/Rogue River War, 600 Tolowa were forcibly relocated to Indian reservations in Oregon, including what is now known as the Siletz Reservation in the Central Coastal Range. Later, some were moved to the Hoopa Valley Reservation in California. Adding to the number of dead from the Yontoket Massacre and the Battery Point Attack are many more in the following years. These massacres included the Chetko Massacre with 24 dead, the Smith creek massacre with 7 dead, the Howonquet Massacre with 70 dead, the Achulet massacre with 65 dead (not including those whose bodies were left in the lake) and the Stundossun Massacre with 300 dead. In total, 902 Tolowa Native Americans were killed in 7 years. There are no records that any of the perpetrators were ever held accountable. This means over 90% of the entire Tolowa population was killed in deliberate massacres.

Language
They have traditionally spoken Taa-laa-wa Dee-ni' Wee-ya' (Tolowa Dee-ni' Language), the Tolowa language, one of the Athabaskan languages.

At the Siletz Reservation in central Oregon, tribes speaking 10 distinct languages were brought together in the mid-19th century. In the early 21st century, the remaining native language spoken is known as Siletz Dee-ni, related to Tolowa, although many of the original tribes spoke Salish languages.

In 2007, in coordination with the Living Tongues Institute for Endangered Languages, the Confederated Tribes of Siletz Indians produced a "talking dictionary" in this language to aid in preservation and teaching. Alfred "Bud" Lane, among the last fluent native speakers of Siletz Dee-ni on the reservation, has recorded 14,000 words of the language in this effort.

Culture
The Tolowa organized their subsistence around the plentiful riverine and marine resources and acorns (san-chvn). Their society was not formally stratified, but considerable emphasis was put on personal wealth.

Tolowa villages were organized around a headman and usually consisted of related men, in a patrilineal kinship system, where inheritance and status passed through the male line. The men married women in neighboring tribes. The brides were usually related (sisters), in order for the wealth to remain in the paternal families.

Ethnobotany
They apply a poultice of the chewed leaves of Viola adunca to sore eyes.

Population
Estimates for the pre-contact populations of most native groups in California have varied substantially. Various estimates for the 1770 population of Tolowa have ranged from as low as 450 to an upper end around 2,400.

In 1910, there were reportedly 150 Tolowa. The 1920 census listed 121 Tolowa left in Del Norte County, California. By 2009, there were approximately 1,000 Tolowa Indians.

See also
 Tolowa language
 Tolowa traditional narratives
 Eunice Bommelyn, Tolowa historian, genealogist and language advocate
 Loren Bommelyn

Notes

Further reading
 Collins, James. 1996. Understanding Tolowa Histories: Western Hegemonies and Native American Responses. London: Routledge.
 Drucker, Philip. 1937. "The Tolowa and their Southwest Oregon Kin," University of California Publications in American Archaeology and Ethnology 36:221–300. Berkeley.
 Gould, Richard A. 1978. "Tolowa," In California, edited by Robert F. Heizer, pp. 128–136. Handbook of North American Indians, William C. Sturtevant, general editor, vol. 8. Smithsonian Institution, Washington, D.C.

External links
Elk Valley Rancheria
Official Tolowa Tribe of the Smith River Rancheria website
About the Tolowa Nation

Clinton Hart Merriam photograph collection, Images of Tolowa People

 
California genocide
Confederated Tribes of Siletz Indians
Native Americans in Del Norte County, California
Native American tribes in California
Native American tribes in Oregon
History of Del Norte County, California